People's Republican Party may refer to:
People's Republican Party (Trinidad and Tobago)
People's Republican Party (Singapore), see list of political parties in Singapore
 People's Republican Party (British Honduras), British Honduras is the old name for Belize
Peoples Republican Party, a political party in India, also known as the Republican Party of India (Kawade)

See also
 Republican People's Party (disambiguation)
 Republican Party (disambiguation)
 People's Party (disambiguation)